Mobile Opera is an opera company located in Mobile, Alabama and is one of the oldest performing arts organizations in the United States, as well as the oldest in the State of Alabama, having been founded as the "Mobile Opera Guild" in 1945.  Under its founder, Madame Rose Palmai-Tenser, a European concert artist from Czechoslovakia, two performances were presented in April 1946. As its General Director, Mrs. Tenser continued to lead the company until 1971.

In July 2002, Mobile Opera relocated its offices to the Josephine Larkins Music Center, a newly renovated rehearsal and administrative facility located in the designated downtown arts district, which the company shares with the Mobile Symphony. This collaboration between the city's performing arts organizations has been instrumental in the revitalization of the downtown area. With a  rehearsal hall, seven private music studios, conference room, catering kitchen, patron ticketing services, landscaped courtyard and administrative offices, the Larkins Music Center is a significant cultural and community asset.

Growth under Katherine Willson and others since 1971
After 1971, Willson became the company's Production Coordinator and General Manager. During the company's 1995/1996 season, she became the first female President of the Board, celebrating Mobile Opera's 50th Anniversary Season and her own thirty-five year involvement with the company. Under Pelham "Pat" Pearce, Mobile Opera maintained its productions' quality and its innovative programs dedicated to education and community outreach. The development of Mobile Opera as a nationally recognized company continued with the ten-year supervision of Jerome Shannon as General Director and conductor. Shannon was succeeded by Earl Jackson who retired in 2011. The company currently operates under the direction of General Director Scott Wright.

Mobile Opera continues to encourage young American operatic talent.  Artists such as Christine Weidinger, Michael Devlin, Susan Quittmeyer, Anthony Laciura, Barry McCauley, Stella Zambalis, Linda Zoghby, Amy Johnson, Philip Webb, Hal France and Sylvia McNair have made appearances with major opera companies such as the Metropolitan Opera, New York City Opera, Chicago Lyric Opera, San Francisco Opera and opera houses and festivals of Europe.

Under General Director, Scott Wright, Mobile Opera continues. Andy Anderson has served as Artistic Director and conductor since 2008. In addition to mainstage productions, programs of opera excerpts are presented in schools and community venues throughout the region. Education and Community Outreach, under the direction of Stacey Driskell, produced "Pigaro's Diner" beginning in 2009. This program on child nutrition has been seen by more than 40,000 Alabama school children.

See also
List of opera companies

References

External links
 Mobile Opera's official website
 Mobile Opera's history from its official website

American opera companies
Cultural institutions in Mobile, Alabama
Musical groups established in 1945
Performing arts in Alabama
1945 establishments in Alabama